Time Out (original title Aeg Maha) is a 1984 Estonian animated short film. It was directed by Priit Pärn and produced by Tallinnfilm.

Plot 
The film is about a cat who loses his time, trying to do many things simultaneously and fails at everything. After that, time breaks apart, and he travels to the world of the infinite absurd. In the end, all returns to its place and problems.

Production 
 The director himself uses his own hands in the "time breaks up" scene.
 The ship's name "Julia" is an author-related easter egg, linking to his previous cartoon "Triangle".
 The statue was supposed to be Vladimir Lenin, but of course was censored.

Reception 
The film was given a 1985 Varna World Animation Film Festival award.

References

External links 
 

1984 films
1984 animated films
1984 short films
1980s animated short films
Animated films about cats
Estonian animated short films
Estonian animated films